Vaidas Slavickas (born 26 February 1986) is a Lithuanian professional footballer who plays for Lithuanian squad Sūduva.

Honours

Club
Sūduva Marijampolė
Lithuanian Championship: 2017, 2018
Lithuanian Cup: 2006, 2009
Lithuanian Supercup: 2009, 2018

External links
 
 
 

1986 births
Living people
Lithuanian footballers
Lithuania international footballers
Lithuanian expatriate footballers
FK Sūduva Marijampolė players
FK Ekranas players
CSM Ceahlăul Piatra Neamț players
A Lyga players
Liga I players
Expatriate footballers in Romania
Lithuanian expatriate sportspeople in Romania
Association football defenders